Cavite's 7th congressional district is one of the eight congressional districts of the Philippines in the province of Cavite. It has been represented in the House of Representatives of the Philippines since 2010. The district consists of Cavite's de facto capital city of Trece Martires and its adjacent municipalities of Amadeo, Indang, and Tanza. It is currently represented in the 19th Congress by Crispin Diego Remulla of the National Unity Party.

Representation history

Election results

2023 special

2022

2019

2016

2013

2010

See also 
 Legislative districts of Cavite

References 

Congressional districts of the Philippines
Politics of Cavite
2009 establishments in the Philippines
Congressional districts of Calabarzon
Constituencies established in 2009